Ian Johnstone Rae (19 January 1933 – 4 July 2005) was a Scottish footballer, who played for Falkirk, Bristol City and Stenhousemuir. He made one appearance for the Scotland under-23 team.

References

External links

1933 births
2005 deaths
People from Grangemouth
Association football fullbacks
Scottish footballers
Falkirk F.C. players
Bristol City F.C. players
Stenhousemuir F.C. players
Scottish Football League players
English Football League players
Footballers from Falkirk (council area)
Scotland B international footballers
Scotland under-23 international footballers